Cardiff South Wales MCC University, formerly Cardiff University Centre of Cricketing Excellence, was formed in 2001, and first appeared in first-class cricket in 2012. The players in this list have all played at least one first-class match for Cardiff MCCU.

Players are listed in order of appearance, where players made their debut in the same match, they are ordered by batting order.

Key

List of players

References

Cardiff MCCU
Student cricket in the United Kingdom